Nucai (Manchu: , Mölendroff: aha) is a Chinese term that can be translated as, 'lackey', 'yes-man', 'servant', 'slave', or a 'person of unquestioning obedience'. It originated in the tribes of northeastern China as a negative and derogatory term, often reserved for insult for someone perceived to be useless or incompetent. However, it was used most prominently in the Qing dynasty as a deprecatory first-person pronoun by Manchu officials at court when addressing the Emperor. Han Chinese officials were forbidden from using the term for self-address; they used "chen" instead.

Usage
During the Qing dynasty, addressing oneself as nucai became a sort of 'privilege' reserved for ethnic Manchu officials. Officials of Han Chinese origin were forbidden to address themselves as nucai, and must address themselves as chen (literally "your subject"). The rule was applied both in written and spoken situations. Such a rule surrounding the term nucai reflected the relationship between Manchu officials and the Emperor as that between "master and servant" in a household, while that between Han Chinese officials and the Emperor as simply between ruler and subject. The equivalent Manchu term for nucai is booi aha. The exclusivity of the term nucai meant that Han Chinese officials were given lower status at court, even though chen was historically considered a more prestigious form of self-address.

In 1773, the Qianlong Emperor received a joint memorial about imperial examinations from Manchu official Tianbao and Han Chinese official Ma Renlong. Both officials jointly signed the memorial as nucai, angering the Qianlong Emperor, who accused Ma Renlong of 'pretending to be a nucai''' when he was not, and later decreed that if a Han Chinese and Manchu official were jointly petitioning the Emperor, they must uniformly use chen instead of nucai.

Chinese scholar Li Xinyu wrote that although the words of "master and servant" (i.e. nucai) has been institutionally abolished with the Chinese monarchy in 1911, people's "nucai mentality" (pejorative phrase for an attitude of servitude to the state or other authority figures) still exists in contemporary China.

Social critics point out that there is a degree of support for the so-called "nucai mentality" within elite circles, particularly by those who adhere by "Asian values". At the 2009 Boao Forum for Asia, actor Jackie Chan criticized Taiwanese and Hong Kong society as "chaotic" because they are "too free", saying "I'm gradually beginning to feel that we Chinese need to be controlled. If we're not being controlled, we'll just do what we want." In the ensuing controversy, the Democratic Progressive Party of Taiwan attacked Chan for having "too strong of a nucai'' mentality" and demanded that the Taipei Municipal Government remove Chan as the spokesman of the Taipei Deaflympics.

See also
Booi Aha
Chinese honorifics
Slavery in seventeenth-century China

References

Further reading
Hudong Baike Entry
 古今的奴才语言和奴才地位：满清奴才地位也特殊 汉人连奴才都当不上 Google translation

Qing dynasty culture
Chinese words and phrases
Slavery in China